Eleven Modern Antiquities is the fourth studio album by Irish pop band Pugwash. It was released in Ireland by 1969 Records on 21 March 2008 and was originally scheduled for worldwide release in an expanded edition on Ape House records in May 2010, but so far this latter edition has not seen release. Two singles were released from the album in Ireland: "Take Me Away" and "At The Sea".

Track listing

Personnel 

 Thomas Walsh: vocals, backing vocals, acoustic guitar, electric guitar, Novatron, Mellotron, Hammond organ, Korg synth, Chamberlin, saxophone, baritone bass guitar, vibes, drums, samples, handclaps
 Keith Farrell: bass guitar, upright bass, Moog, Mellotron, Hammond organ, electric guitar, acoustic guitar, piano, samples, backing vocals
 Johnny Boyle: drums, percussion, handclaps
 Jason Falkner: electric guitars, piano, percussion
 Nelson Bragg: sleighbells, wood block, shakers, conga, güiro, castanets, tambourine, bongo, cymbal, shovel, handclaps, backing vocals
 Neil Hannon: zither, glockenspiel, piano, organ, Kawai R-1A rhythmer, Rhodes piano, vocals, vocoder
 Dave Gregory: piano, electric guitar, string arrangements
 Aidan O'Grady: cymbal, handclaps
 Rike Soeller: cello
 Stephen Farrell: slide guitar, electric guitar
 Eric Matthews: flugelhorn, backing vocals
 Andy Partridge: kazoo, Mellotron brass, acoustic guitar, swanee whistle
 Michael Penn: electric guitar
 Daragh Bohan: Mellotron, vocals
 Paul Bohan: vocals
 Section Quartet: strings

References 

2008 albums
Pugwash (band) albums